Satuek is a district (amphoe) in the northeastern part of Buriram province, northeastern Thailand.

Geography
Neighboring districts are (from the south clockwise) Krasang, Huai Rat, Ban Dan, Khu Mueang, Khaen Dong of Buriram Province, Chumphon Buri, Tha Tum, Chom Phra, and Mueang Surin district of Surin province.

History
Originally a tambon of Mueang Buriram district, the minor district (king amphoe) Satuek was created in 1938. It was upgraded to a full district on 1 November 1947.

Administration
The district is divided into 12 sub-districts (tambons), which are further subdivided into 190 villages (mubans). Satuek is a township (thesaban tambon) which covers parts of tambons Satuek and Nikhom. There are a further 12 tambon administrative organizations (TAO).

Missing numbers are tambon which now form Khaen Dong District.

References

Satuek